Paul Bradley (September 2, 1940 – September 1, 2003) was a Canadian actor, best known for his role as Joey in the classic Canadian film Goin' Down the Road.

Bradley and his Goin' Down the Road co-star Doug McGrath were jointly named the winners of the Canadian Film Award for Best Actor in 1970.Goin' Down the Road director Donald Shebib made a documentary film about him for CBC Television's Telescope, titled Born Hustler.

His other acting credits included the television series This Is the Law, The Hart and Lorne Terrific Hour and The Whiteoaks of Jalna, as well as the films The Merry Wives of Tobias Rourke, Wedding in White and Lions for Breakfast.

Bradley died in 2003 in Victoria, British Columbia.

References

External links

1940 births
2003 deaths
Canadian male film actors
Best Actor Genie and Canadian Screen Award winners
Canadian male television actors